"Lipstick and Bruises" is a song by American rock band Lit, released in 2001. The song was featured on their third album Atomic as the lead single. The song was also featured in a 2001 movie Out Cold and the following year on the 2002 movie starring Britney Spears, Crossroads. The song peaked at number 10. on the Billboard's Modern Rock chart making it the most successful single on the album.

Music video
The music video features the band playing at a concert. The music video was directed by Mark Gerard.

Track listing
US CD single
"Lipstick and Bruises" – 2:59

Chart performance

References

2001 songs
RCA Records singles
Lit (band) songs